The 2018–19 Iowa State Cyclones men's basketball team represented Iowa State University during the 2018–19 NCAA Division I men's basketball season. The Cyclones were coached by Steve Prohm, who was in his fourth season at Iowa State. They played their home games at Hilton Coliseum in Ames, Iowa as members of the Big 12 Conference. They finished the season 23-12, finishing in 5th place. In the Big 12 tournament, they defeated Baylor, Kansas State, and Kansas to win the Big 12 tournament. They received an automatic bid as a 6th seed in the  NCAA tournament where they were upset by 11th seed Ohio State in the First Round.

Previous season
The Cyclones finished the 2017–18 season 13–18, 4–14 in Big 12 play to finish in last place. They lost in the first round of the Big 12 tournament to Texas.

Offseason

Departures

Incoming transfers

2018 recruiting class

Future recruits

2019–20 team recruits

Roster

Schedule and results

|-
!colspan=12 style=| Regular Season

|-
!colspan=12 style=| Big 12 Tournament

|-
!colspan=12 style=| NCAA tournament

Awards and honors

 Big 12 Player of the Week

Marial Shayok (January 7)

 Big 12 Newcomer of the Week

Talen Horton-Tucker (November 19)
Tyrese Haliburton (December 10)
Tyrese Haliburton (January 7)
Marial Shayok (January 21)
 Big 12 Sixth Man of the Year

Lindell Wigginton

Rankings

^Coaches did not release a Week 1 poll.
*AP does not release post-NCAA Tournament rankings

See also
 2018–19 Iowa State Cyclones women's basketball team

References

Iowa State Cyclones men's basketball seasons
Iowa State
Iowa State Cyc
Iowa State Cyc
Iowa State